Kostovite is  a rare orthorhombic-pyramidal gray white telluride mineral containing copper and gold with chemical formula AuCuTe4.

It was discovered by Bulgarian mineralogist Georgi Terziev (Георги Терзиев) (1935–1972), who named it in honor of his professor Ivan Kostov (Иван Костов) (1913–2004). In 1965 kostovite was approved as a new species by the International Mineralogical Association. The type locality is the Chelopech copper ore deposit, Bulgaria. Small deposits have also been found in Kochbulak (Eastern Uzbekistan), Commoner mine (Zimbabwe), Kamchatka (Russian Far East), Ashanti (Ghana), Buckeye Gulch (Leadville, Colorado, US), Bisbee (Arizona, US), Kutemajärvi (Finland), Coranda-Hondol (Romania), Glava (Sweden), Bereznjakovskoje (Southern Urals, Russia), Moctezuma (Sonora, Mexico), Panormos Bay (Tinos Island, Greece), Guilaizhuang Mine, Tongshi complex (Linyi Prefecture, Shandong Province, China), Kalgoorlie-Boulder City, (Goldfields-Esperance region, Western Australia, Australia).

See also

List of minerals named after people

References

External links
 
 

Sulfosalt minerals
Telluride minerals
Gold minerals
Copper minerals
Orthorhombic minerals
Minerals in space group 28
Minerals described in 1965